The 2007 UCI ProTour was the third year of the UCI ProTour system. Following a dispute and power struggle between the UCI and the organisers of the Grand Tours, ASO, RCS and Unipublic, a number of events were run as ProTour events, although without ProTour licences. Races counted towards the ProTour standings, although the organisers were not obliged to invite all 20 UCI ProTeams, notably not inviting Unibet.com.

After numerous doping scandals in previous years, culminating with Floyd Landis' doping scandal in the 2006 Tour de France, the  team was disbanded when the new title sponsor, iShares, decided to cease sponsoring and pull out of cycling. The links between the ProTour and the organisers of the three Grand Tours (ASO, RCS MediaGroup and Unipublic) remain strained.

The 2007 Paris–Nice race was the focus of a dispute between (ASO) and the UCI. ASO have requested that the 2007 edition be downgraded from ProTour status to NE (national calendar status), therefore lacking UCI world-ranking points and threatening the participation of the ProTeams. This was resolved to an extent though and Paris–Nice took place as the first ProTour race of the season, although without .

2007 ProTour races

Züri-Metzgete race was scheduled in Switzerland for October 7, but the race was cancelled.

Teams

Individual standings

 241 riders have scored at least one point on the 2007 UCI ProTour.

Team standings

Nation standings

 Riders from 30 nations scored at least one UCI ProTour point

2007 ProTour Points System

 If a rider is not part of UCI ProTour, no points are given. The points corresponding to the place are not awarded
 Top 20 teams get points in scale 20-19-18...1.
 Team time trials in stage races doesn't give points for riders.
 In Eindhoven time trial rider has to finish to earn points.
 In country ranking, top 5 riders of each country count towards the ranking.

References

External links
 Official Website

 
 ProTour
2007